Among the Sleep is a first-person survival horror action-adventure video game developed by Norwegian developer Krillbite Studio for Microsoft Windows, OS X, Linux, PlayStation 4, and Xbox One. It was released on 29 May 2014 in North America for the PC. The PlayStation 4 version was released on 10 December 2015 whilst the Xbox One version was released on 3 June 2016. A definitive remaster titled Among The Sleep: Enhanced Edition was released for Windows on 2 November 2017, and later released for PS4, Xbox One and Nintendo Switch on 29 May 2019.

Gameplay
Among the Sleep  is a first-person exploration game seen from the view of a toddler. The player can move the cursor to walk or crawl around, the latter of which is faster and is required to slide through obstacles blocking the way. Running is an available option, though the player will fall down if it is done for too long. The player can interact with and push objects, and open doors and windows. Sometimes, the handle to open doors is too tall to reach for the player, in which case the player will have to push and climb chairs for additional height. Other than chairs, the player can climb boxes, tables, and various things to reach otherwise unreachable ledges and heights. Certain objects can also be held as well as thrown away. Others can be stored to the inventory and taken out again for later use.

For most of the game, the player is accompanied by a sentient teddy bear named Teddy, a birthday present from the toddler's father. The player can hug Teddy, who emits light that helps the player navigate through darker environments. The light will wear down after a while, but will recharge if left unused. If the player drops Teddy, which always happens whenever they arrive from sliding through pipes to a new level or environment, they will have to pick it up first before advancing again.

Throughout the game, the player is followed by two monsters: a feminine figure that haunts the first three levels, and a trench coat-wearing figure that haunts the final level. The monsters' appearance is indicated by the blurring of the vision, grating sounds, and in the case of the feminine figure, a slow lullaby ("Trollmother's Lullaby") hummed about. There is no way to fend off the monsters; if they appear, the player will have to run away or hide under tables or chairs until they go away. If the player is not quick enough to evade the monsters, a short cinematic will show the monsters taking hold of the player, which results in a game over, followed by a continue screen with a pacifier. Clicking the pacifier restarts the game from the last checkpoint. The player can get a game over by other means, such as falling into water or chasms.

The game is largely linear, though the expansive environment with multiple obstacles may induce the feeling of being lost. After some time exploring the player's house, the player is taken to a dreamlike location with a gingerbread house-like hut that serves as a sort of hub level. The house contains a circular door that leads to a new level, surrounded by four containers where "memories" obtained from each level are stored. After the player finds a memory and heads to a tube at the end of the level, they will be returned to this hut. Once four memories are stored, the player can insert Teddy's right hand below the circular door to return to the player's house.

In the extra downloadable content level, instead of exploring dreamlike locations, the player is taken to another house with the objective of finding and thawing five frozen dolls by playing music or turning on the TV. The gameplay is still the same, with the feminine figure haunting the player, but the player is also confronted by a fireplace monster in the underground section that advances and closes in through an aisle.

Plot

Set in the 1990s, a toddler named David is having his second birthday celebration at his home with his mother Zoey. The celebration is interrupted by a visitor at the front door who is hidden from David, but the story suggests it is David's father Justin, who has divorced Zoey and married an actress. The conversation is muffled and partly kept from David as Zoey raises her voice, refusing Justin's request to see his child. Zoey's angry tone frightens David, whose fear is presented as blurred vision. Quickly, Zoey returns with a gift, but she does not say who the gift is from. Instead, she carries David and the gift upstairs to the child's room, a place of bright, warm colors and streaming sunlight. Zoey opens the gift but looks at what is inside with a disdainful expression before shutting the gift box. Before the present is given to David, the telephone rings, and Zoey leaves David in the bedroom to play alone. The gift is revealed to be a sentient teddy bear, who climbs out of the box and hides in the chest until David finds him. The bear introduces himself as Teddy. Teddy has a friendly, curious nature. After a few minutes of playing together with a music box, a stuffed pink elephant, a storybook, and a toy train, they go into the closet, which turns out to be a large, dark room filled with long, dark-colored coats. Teddy says that if David gets scared in the dark, he can hug Teddy to feel safer. Once David holds Teddy, he lights the way, acting like a flashlight. The small adventure is ended by Zoey finding them; she tells David, gently but ominously, to stop hiding from her and puts him to bed.

Later that night, Teddy is taken away from David by an unseen force. David goes after it and finds Teddy inside a washing machine. He unplugs it and takes him out. Teddy realizes that something is not right and that they must find Zoey. Along the way, they encounter a shadowy figure called Harald. The search leads them to discover a slide that takes them to a small playhouse within a cavern that is presumably under the house, and the door found inside it leads them into a journey through several surreal environments, consisting of an underground playground, a dilapidated mansion that has merged with a marshy forest, and a bizarre series of corridors created by hundreds of closets. Teddy instructs David to find four memories he shared with Zoey that will lead them to her. The memories take the forms of four objects: Her pendant from her necklace shown at the start of the game, the music box she plays to put him to sleep at night, the storybook, and the pink elephant. Throughout the search, David is pursued by a large, feminine, troll-like monster named Hydra and a creature with glowing white eyes named Heap, who has a coat as a body like the ones in David's closet earlier.

After the last memory is found, Teddy and David try to go through the slide that would lead back to the playhouse, but Heap grabs onto Teddy to stop David from completing the last memory. David hangs over an  abyss and Teddy's arm is ripped off due to David's weight. David then falls into a dark place lit by a series of floodlights. David follows Zoey's voice and sees her drinking from a bottle as she transforms into the different monsters (implying that Zoey, Hydra, Harald, and Heap are all the same beings) before disappearing. David is left alone in the dark, with window lights coming up ahead, leading him back to the playhouse. After using the last memory and Teddy's torn arm to open the playhouse's door, David sees cracks in a door that is straight ahead. Once through the door, David is back in his room (having exited through the closet). David heads downstairs to find Zoey crying in the kitchen, with the damaged Teddy in one hand, and an empty wine bottle in the other, which she drops. When David attempts to retrieve Teddy, Zoey knocks David over and shouts at him to leave her alone. She apologizes and tells David she did not mean to, and that it is too much. David has the option of briefly comforting Zoey should he interact with her again.

There is a knock at the front door that Zoey does not react to; instead, she continues crying. When David goes to the door, it opens and reveals a glowing white light. Justin is heard talking to David, remarking on Teddy's broken arm, stating that he can fix him. It is implied that Justin gains full custody of his child after this.

Prologue
An expansion level available through downloadable content is set before the events of the main story, again told from David's point of view. David is wandering through a winter environment and finds five dolls surrounding a light that breaks, sending David to a house different from the one shown in the main story. David is required to locate and thaw the five dolls that are frozen due to the freezing wind from outside coming through the open windows, which involves closing the windows and using music and TV to free them. Throughout the house, bright flashback figures of David's parents are shown arguing due to Zoey's alcohol abuse because she felt neglected for taking care of David by herself while Justin was working all day to gain enough money to support themselves and their child, one flashback shows that he hits her when she collapses to the floor (implying he was protecting David from Zoey's drunken state, resulting of the divorce). Along the way, David encounters Harald from the main story (the one that appeared in the living room but has a different form) and a living furnace monster named Hons in the basement. Once David finds all of the dolls, including the rabbit one found outside the house after it has fallen from a window, Zoey is seen taking David before going away in depression, implying that the house is Justin's house and that Zoey is taking David to the house seen in the main story, leaving the doll out in the cold.

Alternate ending
This 'bad ending' was scrapped from the story but was placed in the enhanced edition of the game. The ending can be accessed at the Museum level. David wakes up in a broken-down, cage-like baby crib in an unknown area. Then he sees Teddy turning a wheel, where the crib is being held, revealing a room with lifeless dolls, all memory items, and a giant cooking pot. The crib stops moving and Teddy walks creepily towards David, 'happily' greeting him with red eyes. From that moment, his neck cracks and giant skeleton-like hands come out of his body, revealing his true ghostly form: "The Nightmare". It turns out the Nightmare has been using young children to collect beloved items to create a stew by disguising them as stuffed toys and tricking children to venture far from their homes and to his hideout. He prepares his meal by placing all the items in the pot and stirring them while reciting the quotes from the toddler's book "Five Thirsty Animals." He then congratulates David for doing his bidding, grabs him, and drops him into the boiling water ready to be devoured.

Development
Development of Among the Sleep began in 2011, and attracted 225,000 NOK (€28,000) on 27 May and 200,000 NOK (€25,000) on 28 October in 2011 in funding from the Norsk Film Institutt (Norwegian Film Institute)  The NFI awarded the company a supplementary 400,000 NOK (€50,000) on 1 March and another 820,000 NOK (€102,700) on 1 November in 2012.

Krillbite Studio gained subsidies by launching a Kickstarter campaign at 18 April 2013, where they managed to pledge $248,358 of a $200,000 target. Achieved stretch goals included a commentary track, downloadable content developed in collaboration with backers, and support for the Oculus Rift virtual reality headset.

Reception

Among the Sleep was met with mixed reviews, receiving 7/10 from both GameSpot and Polygon, and accruing an average score of 66 out of 100 on Metacritic.

As of 7 March 2015, over 100,000 copies of the game had been sold.

Notes

References

External links

Developer Krillbite Studio website

2014 video games
Action-adventure games
Indie video games
Single-player video games
Kickstarter-funded video games
Linux games
MacOS games
Windows games
Xbox One games
PlayStation 4 games
Nintendo Switch games
Psychological horror games
Video games about children
Video games about bears
Fictional teddy bears
Video games about toys
Sentient toys in fiction
Video games about birthdays
Video games set in the 1990s
Video games developed in Norway